Visby City Wall ("Visby Ring Wall", sometimes Visby stadsmur, "Visby City Wall") is a medieval defensive wall surrounding the Swedish town of Visby on the island of Gotland. As the strongest, most extensive, and best preserved medieval city wall in Scandinavia, the wall forms an important and integral part of Visby World Heritage Site.

Of the 29 large and 22 smaller towers, 27 large and 9 small remain. A number of houses that predate the wall were incorporated within it during one of the two phases of construction. During the 18th century, fortifications were added to the wall in several places and some of the towers rebuilt to accommodate cannons.

History 
The oldest part of the city wall is a defensive tower, today called the Kruttornet (the Gunpowder Tower), which was erected at the harbor entrance in the 12th century, making it the oldest surviving non-religious building in the Nordic countries. It was not until the 1270s and 1280s, that the building of a proper defense for the town of Visby started, with the erection of the land-facing wall. On the town-side, the wall had a raised platform for archers with regularly spaced openings for firing arrows while between the narrow openings there were arrowslits. According to dendrochronological examinations, the Österport (the East Gate) was built no earlier than 1286, followed by two more in  1289: the Norderport (North Gate) and 1294 the Snäckgärdsporten (the Snäckgärds Gate). Around the 1290s and early 1300s, about 20 large towers were added between the gates.

The construction of the wall was probably connected to conflicts that arose between the town of Visby and the thing or assembly of Gotland, which led to a civil war on the island in 1288. A part of the wall east of Kvarntornet (the Mill Tower) which has been razed possibly dates from the beginning of this war, when Visby was captured and plundered.

Construction of city walls was unusual in Nordic countries during the Middle Ages, and so the construction of the city wall testifies to Visby's commercial importance during this time. In medieval Sweden, only Stockholm, Kalmar and Visby had city walls.

The last major rebuilding of the city wall occurred in the 1350s, when the wall was strengthened and its height increased by an additional . Its defenses were also augmented with approximately twenty new towers attached to the east part of the wall. When King Valdemar IV of Denmark captured the town in 1361, he ordered a part of the wall to be torn down as a symbolic act. It was done to emblematize the town's subjugation, a practice going back to classical antiquity. The razed part of the wall was rebuilt in 1363. The corner tower known as the Silverhättan (the Silver Cap) probably dates from the period in which Visby belonged to the Teutonic Knights (1398–1408). It is possible that two lesser towers facing the sea, also date from this time. The last great attack on Visby took place in 1525, when troops from Lübeck assaulted the town. The Lübeckerbräschen (the Lübeck Breach) is traditionally assumed to be the visible remains of the troops' breach into the town, but is more likely due to a later collapse of this part of the wall. However, it is in the part of the wall where the troops from Lübeck most probably damaged the town's defenses.

During the 17th and early 18th century, two caponiers were added to the eastern section of the wall. The defensive purpose of the wall had by that time otherwise completely ceased and the wall survived mainly in its capacity as a toll barrier. When domestic tolls were abolished in Sweden in 1810, the city wall was already a known landmark, which guaranteed its survival.

The city wall was restored in 1884 to 1886 by architect Emil Victor Langlet.

Restoration of the collapsed section began in 2013.

The wall is the strongest, most extensive medieval city wall in Scandinavia and the best preserved. Large parts of the original wall remain intact, and it incorporates the majority of the medieval large full-length towers, so-called "saddle towers" (small towers riding on the wall) and gates. In addition, large parts of the original system of trenches have been preserved outside the wall. The city wall is mostly unencumbered by the presence of modern buildings with very few visible from outside the wall. Taken as a whole, this provides for a uniquely genuine picture of what a medieval city wall was like in its original state.

Construction 

The wall was built during two periods, the 13th and the 14th century. It is made from locally quarried limestone, rubble limestone filling,  fat lime mortar and clay mortar. The first wall was lower than at present and constructed as two thin walls of solid limestone with rubble used to fill the gap between them. When the height of the wall was increased during the second building phase, solid limestone stabilized with lime mortar was added on top of the first wall. Due to this, most of the weight of the wall is carried by the two thinner outer stone layers of the first wall. The joints of lime mortar in these layers were reinforced with stronger cement during 20th century restorations.

Originally, the wall had 29 large regular towers and 22 small towers riding on top of the wall, 27 of the large and 9 of the small towers remain.

The wall encloses the old town of Visby which is built on a steep slope facing the Baltic Sea.

Towers, buildings, gates and parts of the wall

Other features

References

Bibliography

External links 
 Visby vallgravar. Kulturhistorisk dokumentation 2010 [Visby trenches. Historical cultural documentation, 2010] (in Swedish).
 Northern Fortresses: Visby

13th-century establishments in Sweden
Visby
Visby
Tourist attractions in Gotland County
Buildings and structures in Gotland County